"A Tenderfoot in Space" is a short story by Robert A. Heinlein, serialized in Boys' Life magazine in May, June, and July 1958.  The original working title was "Tenderfoot on Venus" when it was written in 1956.  It was extensively cut according to orders by the magazine editor for its published form.  It was reprinted in the 1992 retrospective Requiem: New Collected Works by Robert A. Heinlein and Tributes to the Grand Master.

Synopsis 
A boy and his dog emigrate to Venus.  The boy joins a local Scout troop, learning how to survive in the Venusian wilderness, with its various dangers.

Further reading

References

External links
 

Short stories by Robert A. Heinlein
1958 short stories
Scouting in popular culture
Short stories set on Venus
Works originally published in Boys' Life